Heighington CE Primary School is a Church of England primary school with academy status located in the village of Heighington, near Newton Aycliffe, County Durham. As of 2016 it educated 279 pupils aged 4–11. At its Ofsted inspection in 2019, it was classed as a ‘good’ school. The headmaster since 1995 has been Neil Parker.

Premises
The premises were extended between 2000 and 2004 with new classrooms and additional administrative space. There was significant local opposition to this expansion on the grounds that children from outside the area would be attracted and this would increase traffic. The plans went ahead despite letters of objection and a petition submitted to the council.

Church bells project
Sponsored by BT, in 2004 the school undertook a project to research the origins of the St Michael's Church bells and produced a DVD and book multimedia package.

School awards
 Artsmark award
 Healthy Schools award
 Sports Active award

Faculty awards
 Neil Parker won the North-East 2002 Leadership Trust Award for School Leadership.

Notable former pupils
 Mark Gatiss, actor

References

External links
 

Primary schools in the Borough of Darlington
Church of England primary schools in the Diocese of Durham
Academies in the Borough of Darlington
Heighington, County Durham